The Ford Duratec V6, is an aluminum DOHC V6 engine with a 60° bank angle introduced in 1993 with the Ford Mondeo. The primary engineering input came from Porsche, who was developing a similar V6 before selling the engineering to Ford, and Cosworth, who helped with cylinder head manufacturing. The Jaguar AJ-V6 engine is similar but adds variable valve timing.

2.5 L 
The Duratec 25 is a 2.5 L (2544 cc) 60° V6 and was introduced in 1994. It was developed for the Ford Contour and also used in the Ford Mondeo and others.

The Duratec 25 was on the Ward's 10 Best Engines list for 1995 and 1996, and the SVT version made the list for 1998 and 1999.

SVT 
It included a larger throttle body from the Duratec 30, a new cone-shaped air filter, and abrasive flow machining processing on the intake manifold. SVT specific cams, a lighter flywheel and low-restriction exhaust complete the picture. The SVT engine was used in the 1998 to 2001 European Ford Mondeo, Ford Cougar and called the ST200, it also appeared in the American Ford Contour SVT.

Duratec 2.5l
Used in the third generation Ford Mondeo and last generation Ford/Mercury Cougar (1999-2002).

Mazda GY 
Mazda used the Duratec 25 block and camshaft in their 2000 MPV. It was replaced in 2002 with the larger 3.0 L Duratec 30-based Mazda AJ.

3.0 L 
Ford's standard DOHC V6 is known as the Duratec 30. It was introduced in 1996 as a replacement for the 3.8 L Essex engine in the Ford Taurus and Mercury Sable. The same engine is used by the Jaguar S-Type, Lincoln LS, Mazda MPV, Mazda6, Mondeo ST220 and many other Ford vehicles. It is essentially a bored-out to  Duratec 25 and is built in Ford's Cleveland Engine #2 plant. A slightly modified version for the Ford Five Hundred entered production at the Cleveland Engine #1 plant in 2004.

It has an aluminum engine block and aluminum DOHC cylinder heads. The cylinders are lined with cast iron. It uses sequential fuel injection, has 4 valves per cylinder and features fracture-split forged powder metal connecting rods and an assembled cast aluminum intake manifold.

The ,  V6 used in the Mondeo ST220 is called the Duratec ST. The ,  V6 in the Mondeo Titanium is called the Duratec SE.

There are two key versions of the Duratec 30:
 DAMB - The Jaguar AJ30 versions have direct-acting mechanical bucket (DAMB) tappets.

Applications:
 
 1996-2005 Ford Taurus/Mercury Sable
 2001-2005 Ford Escape/Mercury Mariner/Mazda Tribute
 2005-2007 Ford Five Hundred, Mercury Montego and Ford Freestyle

VVT

The 2006 Ford Fusion, Mercury Milan, and Lincoln Zephyr feature a version of the Duratec 30 utilizing variable valve timing. The VVT is a RFF engine derived from the Mazda MZI and does not have the mechanical buckets as on the Lincoln LS version.

In second generation of the engine, it is updated to run on E85. To achieve this, the engine now includes Cam Torque Actuated Variable Cam Timing developed with BorgWarner. Fuel saving features include adaptive knock control and aggressive deceleration fuel cutoff.

First generation
2006-2009 Ford Fusion
2006-2009 Mercury Milan
2006 Lincoln Zephyr
2004-2008 Mazda6
Second generation
2010-2012 Ford Fusion
2010-2011 Mercury Milan
2009-2012 Ford Escape

Replacement 
The Fusion later received the all new Duratec 35 V6 as an option to remain competitive with the Toyota Camry and Honda Accord. Eventually, the Duratec 30 was discontinued in favor of the newer Duratec 35 and its variants.

Other applications
A twin-turbocharged version of this engine is used in the Noble M400, a British sports car. Noble has used forged pistons, an oil cooler, a larger baffled oil sump and extra cooling ducts to maintain its durability. .

It has a weight-to-power ratio of /hp. As with the Noble M400, the Q1 uses a  transversely-mounted, rear mid-engine, rear-wheel drive layout, twin-turbocharged engine.

Mazda's MZI version adds variable valve timing, as does Jaguar's AJ30. Note that the MZI name is also used in Europe on Mazda's version of the Ford Sigma I4.  The ,  V6 used in the Mondeo ST220 is called Duratec ST.   V6 in the Mondeo Titanium is called Duratec SE. 

A racing version of this engine exists and is used on mini prototypes like the Juno SS3 V6. The engine has a 40-hour racing life span before it needs to be rebuilt with rings and bearings, and has proven very reliable and competitive. The engine has a Jaguar badge, and is branded as a Jaguar  V6 since it is built and mostly sold in the U.K.

3.4 L SHO V8

Ford's 3.4 L SHO V8 is related to the 2.5 L Duratec V6.  Each cylinder uses the same bore and stroke as the 2.5 L, but this engine was never officially referred to with the Duratec name.

5.9 L V12 

Ford's 5.9 L V12 version of its Duratec engine is used in the present Aston Martin lineup. It is best thought of as two  Duratec V6s mated end to end, albeit with slightly larger main journals. The engine has also received extensive crankshaft modifications, giving the engine uneven firing intervals. The regular Aston Martin V12 uses roller rockers (RFF), and was designed by Ford and Cosworth. 
 
 Cosworth assembled the V12 engines for a year before Aston Martin took over production. 
 However, Cosworth still casts the heads and blocks. 
  The variant used in the Aston Martin One-77 uses (DLC coated) DAMB cam followers like the later Duratec engines, and is built by Cosworth.

See also
 Ford Duratec engine
 List of Ford engines

References

Duratec V6
V6 engines
Gasoline engines by model